Farnham Road Hospital is a mental health hospital in Guildford, Surrey. It is managed by Surrey and Borders Partnership NHS Foundation Trust. The main building is a Grade II listed building.

History
The foundation stone for the hospital was laid at a site donated by the Earl of Onslow in Farnham Road in Guildford in 1863. The 60-bed hospital was designed by Edward Ward Lower drawing on the ideas of Florence Nightingale and was opened as the Royal Surrey County Hospital in April 1866. The Royal Surrey County Hospital moved to its current site in Egerton Road in Guildford in 1979.

The Farnham Road site was redeveloped between December 2013 and December 2015 to create a modern purpose-built mental health facility.

References

External links
Official site

Hospital buildings completed in 1866
Hospitals in Surrey
1866 establishments in England
NHS hospitals in England
Psychiatric hospitals in England